Schrei x is a live performance album by avant-garde musician Diamanda Galás, released on 23 September 1996 by Mute Records.

Track listing

Personnel
Diamanda Galás – vocals
Production and additional personnel
Blaise Dupuy – recording, mixing, production
Robert Knoke – photography
Mandy Parnell – mastering

Release history

References

External links 
 

Diamanda Galás albums
1996 live albums
Mute Records live albums